Teegala Krishna Reddy (born 10 June 1949) is an Indian politician, a former Member of Legislative Assembly and a former Mayor of Hyderabad, from Telangana state. He is currently in the Bharat Rashtra Samithi.

Early life 
Reddy was born in Ranga Reddy district, Meerpet. He completed his BA in 1971 from Osmania University. He is the Chairman of Teegala Krishna Reddy Engineering College.

Career 
Reddy joined the Telugu Desam Party during its foundation. He contested the Municipal Corporation of Hyderabad (MCH) elections in 1986 from Gandhi Nagar division on behalf of the Telugu Desam Party and lost. Reddy contested the MCH elections in 2002 and served as the Mayor of Hyderabad until 2007.

He worked as the Chairman of Hyderabad Urban Development Authority. In the 2009 Andhra Pradesh elections, he contested as a Telugu Desam Party candidate from the Maheswaram constituency and was defeated by Indian National Congress candidate Sabitha Indra Reddy by a margin of 7,833 votes.

In the 2014 Telanagana elections, he contested as a Telugu Desam Party candidate again from Maheshwaram constituency and was elected MLA for the first time by beating his nearest rival Congress candidate Mal Reddy Rangareddy with a majority of 30,784 votes. He joined Telangana Rashtra Samithi on 29 October 2014. In the 2018 Telangana elections he contested as a Telangana Rashtra Samithi candidate from Maheshwaram constituency and was defeated by Indian National Congress candidate Sabitha Indra Reddy by a margin of 9,227 votes.

References 

1949 births
Telugu Desam Party politicians
Mayors of Hyderabad, India
Telangana Rashtra Samithi politicians
Telangana politicians
Living people